Jacobus (foaled 1880 in New York state) was an American Thoroughbred racehorse who won the 1883 Preakness Stakes.

Background
Bred by August Belmont at his Nursery Stud in Babylon, New York, Jacobus was sold to James E. Kelley along with other unraced colts for $10,000.

Racing career
Raced at age two, Jacobus won the Surf Stakes at Sheepshead Bay Race Track. He ran third in the Juvenile Stakes at Jerome Park and third again in both the Hopeful Stakes and August Stakes at Monmouth Park.

As a three-year-old, Jacobus' ran third behind winner Barnes in the mile and one-half Coney Island Derby at Sheepshead Bay. The biggest win of his career came in what would become the second leg of the U.S. Triple Crown series, the 1883 Preakness Stakes. In a two-horse matchup run over a mile and one-half at Pimlico Race Course, jockey George Barbee erned his third Preakness win by guiding Jacobus to a four length win over his only competitor, Parnell.

Pedigree

References

1880 racehorse births
Racehorses bred in New York (state)
Racehorses trained in the United States
Thoroughbred family 4
Preakness Stakes winners